Farida Hasan is a Bangladesh Nationalist Party politician and a Member of Parliament from reserved seat of Women.

Career
Hasan was elected to parliament from reserved seat as a Bangladesh Nationalist Party candidate in 1991.

References

Bangladesh Nationalist Party politicians
Date of birth missing (living people)
5th Jatiya Sangsad members
Women members of the Jatiya Sangsad
20th-century Bangladeshi women politicians